Binnum is a locality in the Australian state of South Australia.

Binnum is northeast of Naracoorte, on the Mount Gambier railway line between Naracoorte and Wolseley, adjacent to the Victorian border which closed on 12 April 1995.

There are 72 people who live in the village, according to a 2016 census.

Victorian member of parliament  Sir William McDonald grew up at Binnum, before marrying and moving a short distance across the border to Neuarpurr, Victoria.

Binnum is located within the federal division of Barker, the state electoral district of MacKillop and the local government area of the Naracoorte Lucindale Council.

References

Towns in South Australia